Biodiversity in agriculture is the measure of biodiversity found on agricultural land. Biodiversity is the total diversity of species present in an area at all levels of biological organization. It is characterized by heterogeneous habitats that support the diverse ecological structure. In agricultural areas, biodiversity decreases as varying landscapes are lost and native plants are replaced with cultivated crops. Increasing biodiversity in agriculture can increase the sustainability of farms through the restoration of ecosystem services that aid in regulating agricultural lands. Biodiversity in agriculture can be increased through the process of agroecological restoration, as farm biodiversity is an aspect of agroecology.

Background 
Agriculture creates a conflict over the use of land between wildlife and humans. Land use for agriculture has been a driving force in creating biodiversity loss. An increase in the amount of pasture and crop land over the last few hundred years has led to the rapid loss of natural habitats. The Food and Agriculture Organization of the United Nations estimates that more than 40% of earth’s land surface is currently used for agriculture. Because so much land has been converted to agriculture, habitat loss is recognized as the driving force in biodiversity loss. A decline in farmland biodiversity can be traced to changes in farming practices and increased agricultural intensity. Nonetheless, according to the FAO, "biodiversity is just as important on farms and in fields as it is in deep river valleys or mountain cloud forests". In recent years, the world has acknowledged the value of biodiversity through treaties formed, such as in the 1992 Convention on Biological Diversity.

The loss of habitat connectivity caused by fragmentation in agricultural areas threatens biodiversity, as it decreases population sizes and restricts its access to external resources. Species facing habitat fragmentation can also create a genetic bottleneck. The decreased gene pool threatens species through factors such as inbreeding depression, where the less advantageous populations lowers the species survival rates. Monoculture is the practice of producing a single crop on a given piece of land, including crop rotation. While monoculture produces optimum yields, it has implications for the biodiversity of farms. Heterogeneity, the diversity of the landscape, has been shown to be associated with species diversity. For example, butterfly abundance has been found to increase with heterogeneity. Land that is not cropped, such as fallow land, grass margins in the spaces between different fields, and strips of scrub along field boundaries increase heterogeneity and thus the biodiversity of a farm. Plants attract insects,  which will attract certain species of birds, and those birds will attract their natural predators. The cover provided by uncropped land allows  species to move across the landscape. In Asian rice, one study showed crop diversification by growing flowering crops in strips beside rice fields could reduce pests so that insecticide spraying was reduced by 70%, yields increase by 5%, together resulting in an economic advantage of 7.5%.

See also
Agroecology

References 

 Altieri, Miguel A. 1999. The ecological role of biodiversity in agroecosystems: Agriculture, Ecosystemsand Environment 74: 19–31.
 Benton, Tim G., Vickery, Juliet A., Wilson, Jeremy D. 2003. Farmland biodiversity: is habitat heterogeneity the key? Trends in Ecology and Evolution 18: 182–188
 Dabbert, Stephan, 2002, Organic Agriculture and the Environment. OECD Publications Service
 Fiedler, Anna K., Landis, Douglas A., Wratten, Steve D. 2008. Maximizing ecosystem services from conservation biological control: The role of habitat management. Biological Control 45: 254–271

 Jackson, Dana L, Jackson, Laura L. 2002. The Farm as Natural Habitat. Island Press, Washington.
 Leopold, Aldo. 1939. The Farmer as a Conservationist. Pages 255–265 in Flader, Susan L., Callicott, J. Baird, editors. The River of the Mother of God. University of Wisconsin Press.
 Macdonald, David W., Service, Katrina. 2007. Key Topics in Conservation Biology. Blackwell Publishing, Oxford.
 Schmidt, Martin H. Tscharntke, Teja. 2005. The role of perennial habitats for Central European farmland spiders. Agriculture, Ecosystems and Environment 105: 235–242
 Shannon, D., Sen, A.M., Johnson, D.B. 2002. A comparative study of the 	microbiology of soils managed under organic and conventional regimes. Soil Use and Management 18: 274–283
 Zhang, Wei., Rickets, Taylor H., Kremen, Claire., Carney, Karen., Swinton, Scott M. 2007. Ecosystem services and dis-services to agriculture. Ecological Economics 64: 253–260

Agroecology
Biodiversity
Ecological restoration
Agriculture and the environment
Environmental impact of agriculture
Habitat
Sustainable agriculture